Carcinus ( Karkinos) is a genus of crabs, which includes Carcinus maenas, an important invasive species, and C. aestuarii, a species endemic to the Mediterranean Sea.

Carcinus maenas

C.  maenas is among the 100 "world's worst alien invasive species". It is native to the northeast Atlantic Ocean and Baltic Sea, but has colonised similar habitats in Australia, South Africa, South America, and both Atlantic and Pacific Coasts of North America. Its successful dispersion has occurred via a variety of mechanisms, such as on ships' hulls, packing materials, bivalves moved for aquaculture, and rafting.

C. maenas is known by different names around the world. In the British Isles, it is generally referred to simply as the shore crab. In North America and South Africa, it bears the name green crab or European green crab. In Australia and New Zealand, it is referred to as either the European green crab or European shore crab.

C.  aestuarii

C.  aestuarii is a native to the Mediterranean Sea. It is very similar to C. maenas, and is sometimes considered to be a subspecies of C. maenas rather than a species in its own right. The two taxa can be distinguished by the front of the carapace, between the eyes, which is short and toothed in C. maenas, but longer and smoother in C. aestuarii. Unlike C. maenas, C. aestuarii has only been implicated in one invasion; the coastline of Japan has been invaded by either C. aestuarii or a hybrid of C. aestuarii and C. maenas.

References

Portunoidea
Crustaceans of the Atlantic Ocean
Crabs